The 1945 Bournemouth by-election was held on 15 November 1945.  The by-election was held due to the elevation to hereditary peerage of the incumbent Conservative MP, Sir Leonard Lyle.  It was won by the Conservative candidate Brendan Bracken, who was a prominent supporter of Winston Churchill and Conservative parliamentarian who had lost his Paddington North seat to Labour in the 1945 Labour landslide. Somewhat unusually, there was a significant swing to the governing party, with Labour achieving a swing of more than 10%.

This election had the biggest swing for an incumbent governing party in a by-election until the 2021 Hartlepool by-election.

References

1945 in England
1945 elections in the United Kingdom
By-elections to the Parliament of the United Kingdom in Hampshire constituencies
By-elections to the Parliament of the United Kingdom in Dorset constituencies
20th century in Hampshire